The A93 is a major road in Scotland and the highest public road in the United Kingdom.  It runs north from Perth through Blairgowrie and Rattray, then through the Grampian Mountains by way of Glenshee, the Cairnwell Pass and Glen Clunie to Braemar in Aberdeenshire. At Braemar, the road then switches east down the strath of the River Dee before crossing the A90 and terminating in Aberdeen.

Route

Leaving Perth it passes Scone Palace, ancient coronation site of Scottish kings and now home to Britain's most northerly racecourse, continues through the planned 19th-century village of Guildtown before crossing the River Isla and passing the famous Meikleour Beech Hedge, planted to commemorate the 1715 Jacobite Rebellion and now the tallest hedge in the world. Five miles north lies Blairgowrie and Rattray, the largest town in Perthshire, where the road crosses the River Ericht. 6 miles up Glenericht it reaches the little village of Bridge of Cally and begins the long climb up into Glenshee, eventually passing the historic settlement of Spittal of Glenshee whose hotel was originally a shelter for travellers run by monks from Coupar Angus abbey. The hotel was destroyed by fire in 2014. At this point it climbs from Glenshee onto the bleak desolate moors of Glenbeg and the snow gates at Spittal of Glenshee, which are regularly closed in winter (which here can be from October to April) to prevent motorists becoming stranded overnight.  At the Cairnwell Pass, the road reaches its maximum elevation of 670 metres (2199 feet) above sea level and passes the Glenshee Ski Centre, Scotland's largest ski centre.  At this point it is the highest public road in the United Kingdom. The southern approach to the Cairnwell Pass used to include a notorious double hairpin bend with steep gradients known as the Devil's Elbow. This was bypassed by a new stretch of road in the early 1970s but the old hairpin bends and World War II anti-tank traps can be accessed on foot from a lay-by part way up the hill.   

Over the summit of the Cairnwell Pass the road enters Aberdeenshire and the standard of the carriageway improves considerably, wider and better surfaced than the 42 miles in Perthshire. Descending now, it runs along deserted Glen Clunie alongside the Clunie Water for 8 miles to Braemar, a village 1110 feet above sea level at the west end of Royal Deeside.  So far the road has been running roughly north but here it turns east for the 60-mile descent to the North Sea at Aberdeen. 10 miles from Braemar it passes Balmoral Castle, holiday home of the Royal Family, then continues through Ballater, where many small local shops display the Royal Warrant, Dinnet, Aboyne, Kincardine O'Neil, Banchory and Peterculter before entering Aberdeen city.

Storms of 2015
A section of the A93 near Crathie collapsed on 29–30 December 2015 due to pressure from the overflowing River Dee. The Dee had burst its banks due to the effects of Storm Frank, which caused very severe flooding across Deeside.

See also
List of the highest roads in Scotland

References

Roads in Scotland
Transport in Perth and Kinross
Transport in Aberdeenshire
Transport in Aberdeen